John Hamilton Andrews  (29 October 1933 – 24 March 2022) was an Australian architect, known for designing a number of acclaimed structures in Australia, Canada and the United States. He was Australia's first internationally recognised architect, and the 1980 RAIA Gold Medalist. He died peacefully in his hometown of Orange on 24 March 2022.

Biography
John Andrews was born in Sydney, New South Wales, and graduated with a bachelor's degree from the University of Sydney in 1956. In 1957 he entered the masters of architecture program at Harvard University. After graduation he worked with John B Parkin Associates in Don Mills, a suburb of Toronto, until 1962. From 1962 until 1967 John Andrews was chairman of the University of Toronto's program in architecture. In 1962 he established John Andrews Architects in Toronto. In 1973 he expanded his practice to Sydney and renamed the firm John Andrews International Pty. Ltd.

From 2007 to 2022 Andrews resided and practiced in Orange in regional New South Wales.

Partial list of works
The following buildings designed either in part or in full by Andrews:

Awards
John Andrews was the recipient of many honours and awards including 
Centennial Medal (Canada)
Massey Medal (Canada)
Arnold Brunner Award, National Institute of Arts and Letters (U.S.);
Ontario Association of Architects 25 Year Award for Scarborough College.

He was awarded the RAIA Gold Medal by the Royal Australian Institute of Architects in 1980 and an Honor Award from the American Institute of Architects.

In 1981, Andrews was made an Officer of the Order of Australia (AO) "in recognition of service to architecture".

References

Further reading 
 </ref>

External links 

 John Hamilton Andrews at the Canadian Encyclopedia 
 John Hamilton Andrews
 John Andrews Fonds, Canadian Architectural Archives, University of Calgary
 

1933 births
2022 deaths
Architects from Sydney
New South Wales architects
University of Sydney alumni
Recipients of the Royal Australian Institute of Architects’ Gold Medal
People educated at North Sydney Boys High School
Harvard Graduate School of Design alumni
20th-century Australian architects
Officers of the Order of Australia